Microsoft Blend for Visual Studio (formerly Microsoft Expression Blend) is a user interface design tool developed and sold by Microsoft for creating graphical interfaces for web and desktop applications that blend the features of these two types of applications. It is an interactive, WYSIWYG front-end for designing XAML-based interfaces for Windows Presentation Foundation, Silverlight and UWP applications. It was one of the applications in the Microsoft Expression Studio suite before that suite was discontinued.

Expression Blend supports the WPF text engine with advanced OpenType typography and ClearType, vector-based 2D widgets, and 3D widgets with hardware acceleration via DirectX.

History
Expression Blend was code-named Sparkle, and originally the product was announced as Microsoft Expression Interactive Designer, before it was renamed Expression Blend in December 2006.

On January 24, 2007, Microsoft released the first public Community Technology Preview of Expression Blend as a free download on their web site. The final version was released to manufacturing along with other Expression products on 30 April 2007. The RTM news was announced at Microsoft's MIX 07 conference for web developers and designers. Expression Blend Service Pack 1 was released in November 2007. Expression Blend requires .NET Framework 3.0. Expression Blend and Expression Web are also available as part of the MSDN Premium subscription.

In December 2012 Microsoft announced that they discontinued the standalone Expression suite tools. Expression Blend was integrated into Visual Studio 2012 and Visual Studio Express for Windows 8.

Release history

See also
Glade Interface Designer
Interface Builder

References

B
User interface builders
2007 software